Lizymol Philipose Pamadykandathil is an Indian dental materials scientist. Her work has been recognised with a Nari Shakti Puraskar - the highest civilian honour exclusively for women in India.

Life
She holds a doctorate and master's degree from Mahatma Gandhi University, Kottayam. She was awarded her doctorate degree in 1998.

She received the Young Scientist Award for the year 2002 of the State Committee on Science, Technology and Environment, Government of Kerala.

She was conferred the youth of the year award in 2015 and received a certificate of appreciation to honour her achievements in science, from the Youths Association, Church of the East, Central Committee, India and the Dr. S. Vasudev Award 2014 of KSCSTE, Govt. of Kerala

On International Women's Day (8 March) 2017 she was one of thirty women and nine institutions who received the Nari Shakti Puraskar - the highest civilian honour for women in India from the Honourable President Ram Nath Kovind at the Presidential Palace in New Delhi. Other award winners from Kerala were temple painter Syamala Kumari and zoologist M.S. Sunil. The award came with 100,000 rupees. She was recognised for developing a bioactive polymer and polymer based composite material which can be used for dental restoration and as bone cement for fixing implants.

She works with the Sree Chitra Tirunal Institute for Medical Sciences and Technology in Trivandrum.

She has been a recipient of the 7th and 10th National Awards for Technology Innovation awarded by Government of India. She is the recipient of Kerala state science literature puraskaram (children science) in 2020 from KSCSTE, the government of Kerala. She has 28 patents including 19 granted Indian patents, 11 transferred technologies and multiple commercialized technologies to her credit.

Publications
 A comparison of efficiency of two photoinitiators for polymerization of light-cure dental composite resins, Journal of Applied Polymer Science, 2008, 107; 3337-3342 S.
 Studies on shrinkage, depth of cure, and cytotoxic behavior of novel organically modified ceramic based dental restorative resins, Journal of Applied Polymer Science, 2010, 116; 2645–2650.
 Studies on new organically modified ceramics based dental restorative resins, Journal of Applied Polymer Science, 2010, 116; 509–517.

Books 
 Lizymol P.P. "DhanthaShuchitwavumArogyavum" in  the local language, Malayalam. Mar Narsai Printers and Publishers, Thrissur, Kerala (Received the Kerala state science Literature award(KSCSTE) 2020(Children’s literature)

Book chapters, journal papers 

1. Saranya C.V. Lizymol P.P*.,  Effect of Soybean Oil and Soy Protein Concentrate on Polymerization Shrinkage (LPS), Depth of Cure (Doc) and Diametral Tensile Strength (DTS) of Visible Light Cured Biocomposites,Trends Biomater. Artif. Organs, 36(2), 84-88 (2022)

2.Bridget JW., Susan Mani, Willi Paul and Lizymol P.P*. Synthesis and characterization of ladder structured ormocer resin of siloxane backbone and methacrylate side chain, Materials Letters https://doi.org/10.1016/j.matlet.2021.131192, 310, 131192 ,2022 (Elsevier)

3. Lizymol P.P*.,  X-ray Microcomputed Tomography (μCT) Studies of a New Low Shrinkage Visible Light Cure Dental Composite (Ormo48): Effects of Thermal Cycling on Physical PropertiesTrends in Biomaterials & Artificial Organs, 36(1), 16-20. (2022)

4. Lizymol P.P*., Effects of Thermal Cycling on Surface Hardness, Diametral Tensile Strength and Porosity of an Organically Modified Ceramic (ORMOCER)-Based Visible Light Cure Dental Restorative Resin, Lizymol P.P. Chapter 15,  In book: Advanced Studies in  Experimental and Clinical Medicine, Modern Trends and Latest Approaches, CRC  Press DOI: 10.1201/9781003057451-17

5. Lizymol P.P*., Vibha C, Effect of processing parameters on physico- mechanical  properties of visible light cure composites, Functionalized Engineering Materials  and Their Applications, Apple Academic Press, Hard ISBN 9781771885232, E- Book ISBN 9781771885249, 15, 11 September 2018.
  
6. Vibha C, Lizymol P.P*., Novel bioactive Strontium containing (tetra methacrylate  resin) composites for medical applications, Advanced Polymeric Materials for Sustainability and Innovations, Apple Academic Press, CRC Press, Taylor and Francis Group,  Hard ISBN 9781771886338, E-Book ISBN 9781315102436, 6, 2 October 2018.

7. Vibha C., Lizymol P P.*  Development of bioactive multifunctional inorganic-organic hybrid resin with polymerizable methacrylate groups for biomedical applications‖ in Nanoparticles in Polymer Systems for Biomedical Applications, Apple Publications, ICNT 2016  Hard ISBN 9781771887038,9, November  2018 .

8. LizymolP.P*.Novel inorganic organic hybrid resins as biomaterials "Recent Advances in 	Material Science; Series   Journal : Composites and Nanocomposites  Editor: Dr. A. K. Haghi, Publisher : Apple Academic Press, (Publisher CRC Press) Canada. (Vol. 4). (2013) Chapter: 8 2013/3/1 Pages 89

9. Lizymol P.P*., VibhaC. ,Deepu D.R., SonalilaxmanWaghmare,
Effect of Zinc oxide nano-particles on polymerization shrinkage and mechanical properties of ORMO- 48, Natural polymers, their composites and nanocomposites: Synthesis and Applications, Editor: AmadouBelalGueye,  Publisher : Apple Academic Press, (Publisher CRC Press) Canada (in press)

9. Comparison of surface microtopography and mechanodegradation characteristics of platelet-rich fibrin membranes using two different centrifugation protocols"Arunima P.R.,S.S.Varghese, Willi Paul, Lizymol P.P.      Journal of International Oral Health, Wolters Kluwer Medknow Publications,13 (4),2021, 407- 414

10. Lizymol, P.P* (2021). Periodontitis Challenges and Possibilities. Trends in Biomaterials & Artificial Organs, 35(4), 397-398
  
11. Lizymol P.P.,* Significance of Human Resource Development in Scientific Research Trends in Biomaterials & Artificial Organs,35(1) 2021113-114 (Commentary)

12. Lizymol P.P*., Paul W, Bioactive Composites for Hard Tissue Regeneration. Trends in Biomaterials & Artificial Organs,2020, 34 (3) ,84-85

13. VibhaC .Lizymol P.P*., Synthesis and characterization of a novel radiopaque dimethacrylate zirconium containing pre-polymer for biomedical applications.Materials Letters 237 (2019) 294–297. doi.org/10.1016/j.matlet.2018.11.098

14. Vaidyanathan, TritalaK,Vaidyanathan, Jayalakshmi,Lizymol PP, Arya Saraswathy, KalliyanakrishnanV,"Study of visible light activated polymerization in BisGMA-TEGDMA monomer with Type 1 and Type 2 photoinitiators using Raman Spectroscopy" Dental Materials, 2017,  33, ( 1),   1–11,IF.3.93

15. Vibha C, Lizymol P.P* (2017) Development of hydroxyapatite-reinforced biocomposites based on polymerizable multifunctional strontium containing inorganic-organic hybrid resins for biomedical applications. Materials Letters (Featured Letter) 197: 63–66 (IF 2.437).

16. VibhaC.Lizymol P.P*., "Effect of inorganic content on thermal stability and antimicrobial properties of inorganic organic hybrid dimethacrylate resins" International Journal of Scientific Research, 04,2015(8)58-59 IF.4.176

17. VibhaC, Lizymol P.P. "Effect of pH during synthesis on molecular weight and polymerization shrinkage of photo polymerized hybrid resins for biomedical applications"  Journal of Bionanoscience 10: 414-417(2016) doi:10.1166/jbns.2016.1391

18. VibhaC., Lizymol P.P., "A bioinspired bioactive multi-component polymerizable material for dental restorative applications; Effects of calcium content on physico mechanical properties" Advanced Materials Letters 8:58-64 (IF 1.46, (2017)
Online Publication Date: 04 Apr 2016 | DOI: 10.5185/amlett.2016.6343

19. Vibha C., Lizymol P.P*., Multifunctional inorganic-organic hybrid resins withpolymerizable methacrylate Groups  for biomedical applications; Effects of synthesis parameters on polymerisation shrinkage and molecular weight  Advanced Materials Letters, Volume 7, Issue 4, Page 289-295, 2016. IF 1.46

20. Lizymol P.P*.Novel inorganic organic hybrid resins as biomaterials “Recent Advances in Material Science; Series   Journal : Composites and Nanocomposites  Editor: Dr.A.K.Haghi, Publisher : Apple Academic Press, (Publisher CRC Press) Canada. (Vol. 4). (2013) Chapter: 8 2013/3/1 Pages 89 (Book chapter).

21. Lizymol P.P*. Physical and Mechanical Properties of Visible Light Cure Composites Based on Novel Organically Modified Ceramic Resins Advanced Materials Research Vol. 685 (2013) pp 50-53.

22. Lizymol P.P.*,Mohanan P.V., ShabareeswaranKalliyanakrishnan V. Biological evaluation of a new organically modified ceramic based dental restorative resin submitted journal of bioactive and compatible polymers Journal of Applied Polymer Science 2012,125, 620–629.

23. Mohanan, PV, Lizymol P.P.; Cytogenetic Evaluation of the Physiological Saline Extract of a Newly Developed Dental Material ORMO-48 Toxicology International, 2011, 18; 155

24. Lizymol, P. P*.; Kalliyana Krishnan, V. Studies on Polymerization and Elution Characteristics of Antibiotic Loaded Acrylic Bone Cements, Journal of Polymer Materials, 2010, 27; 257-266

25. Lizymol, P. P*.Studies on new organically modified ceramics based dental restorative resins, Journal of Applied Polymer Science, 2010, 116; 509-517.'''

 (Special highlight in Technology News Focus 2010-03-17 “New findings from P.P.Lizymol and co-authors describe advances in applied polymer science”  
 Journal of Technology March 16, 2010 “New findings from P.P. Lizymol and co-authors describe advances in applied polymer science”

26. Lizymol, P.P*, Studies on shrinkage, depth of cure, and cytotoxic behavior of novel organically modified ceramic based dental restorative resins, Journal of Applied Polymer Science, 2010, 116; 2645-2650,

 Special highlight in News RX, 2010-05-11 “Studies from P.P.Lizymol and colleagues reveal new findings in Medical Science”s.

 Science Letter, May 11th, 2010 “Studies from P.P.Lizymol and colleagues reveal new findings on polymer science” Source:)

27. Lizymol, P. P*.; Kalliyana Krishnan, V., Aging Effects of Dental Restorative Materials upon Surface Hardness, Journal of Polymer Materials, 2009, 26; 207-214

28.Lizymol, P. P*.; Krishnan, V.K.,A comparison of efficiency of two photoinitiators for polymerization of light-cure dental composite resins, Journal of Applied Polymer Science, 2008, 107; 3337-3342

 Special highlight in “Data from P.P. Lizymol and colleagues advance knowledge in applied polymer science”. Source: Technology Business Journal (2008-03-24)

29. Pankajakshan, Divya; Philipose, Lizymol P; Palakkal, Minshiya; V.K Krishnan,  Lissy K. Krishnan*,	Development of a fibrin composite-coated poly(epsilon-caprolactone) scaffold for potential vascular tissue engineering applications., Journal of Biomaterial Research:Part B Applied Biomaterials  , 2008, 87; 570-9, IF: 2.75

30.V.Kalliyanakrishnan*, .Lizymol P.P. T.V. Kumari, T.A.Rauf and   M.M.Thomas ,Development and evaluation of a single solution bonding agent as a dental adhesive  Journal of Polymer Materials, 200522(2), 145-152

31. KalliyanakrishnanV.*, LizymolP.P. and Jacob K Abraham,Synthesis and characterization of a urethane dimethacrylate resin with application in dentistry, Journal of Polymer Materials, 2004, 21(2), 137-144

32. LizymolP.P.* Thermal studies: a comparison of the thermal properties of different oligomers by thermogravimetric techniques, J Applied Polymer Science 200493: 977-985,

33. LizymolP.P.* Effects of Diluent Concentration upon the Properties of Organically Modified Ceramics Based Composites for Application in Dentistry,J Applied Polymer Scienc,e2004, 94: 469-473, 
				
34. Lizymol P.P.andKalliyanakrishnanV.* A study of the diluent effect on the properties of urethane based dental composites, Journal of Polymer Materials, 2003 20(1) 59-66

35. JayabalanM. * and LizymolP.P., Studies on stability of biuret based polyurethane potting compound under autoclaving conditions, Journal of the Indian Chemical Society, 2002, 79; 179-182
					
36. JayabalanM.*, Lizymol  P.P.andVinoy Thomas ,Synthesis of hydrolytically stable low elastic modulus polyurethane urea for  biomedical applications ,  Polymer International, 2000, 49, 88 – 92,

37. JayabalanM.* and Lizymol P.P., Capped oligomer of isocyanate of acrylic monomers as potential bioerodible  tissue adhesive, Journal of Polymer Materials, 2000,  17, 9 – 12

38. KalliaynakrishnanV.*,.LizymolP.P.and Sindhu P.Nair, Urethane tetramethacrylates: Novel substitutes as resin matrix in radiopaque dental composites, Journal of Applied Polymer Science, 1999, 74, 735 – 746,

39. Lizymol P.P.* and SabuThomas,Poly (vinyl chloride)(PVC) as a common solvent for enhancing the miscibility of  poly (ethylene-co(vinyl  acetate)(EVA)/poly (styrene-co-acrylonitrile)(SAN) blends  Journal of Material Science Letters 1998,17, 507 – 510

40.JayabalanM.* and.LizymolP.P,Studies on the effect of crosslinker on the stability of castor oil based aliphatic  polyurethane potting compound,.Polymer Degradation and Stability, 1997,58, 251 – 255 IF: 3.291

41.Lizymol P.P* and SabuThomas, Flame retardant properties of binary blends; a comparison of miscible and immiscible blends, Polymer Degradation and Stability, 1997,57, 187 – 189, IF: 3.291

42. LizymolP.P*   S.Thomas and M.Jayabalan, 
Effect of dehydrochlorination of PVC on miscibility and phase separation of binary and ternary blends of poly(vinyl chloride),poly (styrene -co - acrylonitrile) and poly(ethylene -co -vinyl acetate) Polymer International, 1997, 44, 23 – 29, IF: 2.409

43. LizymolP.P.* ,S.Thomas and M.Jayabalan ,Rheological behaviour of binary and ternary blends of poly(vinyl chloride)(PVC),poly(ethylene - co -vinyl acetate)(EVA) and poly(styrene -co -acrylonitrile) (SAN ), European Polymer Journal, 1997,33, 1397 – 1399, IF: 3.005

44. JayabalanM.* and Lizymol P.P.,Effect of gamma radiation sterilization on the stability of polyurethane potting  compound based on castor oil / SMDI and caprolactonepolyol / SMDI used for hollow fiber haemodialyzer,Bulletin of Material Science, 1997, 20, 727 – 735, IF: 0.870

45. JayabalanM. * and Lizymol P.P.,Effect of autoclaving sterilization on the stability of polyurethane potting   compound based on caprolactone polyol, Journal of Polymer Materials, 1997,14, 49 - 52

46.	Lizymol  P.  Pand  JayabalanM.* Rheological behaviour of polyurethane prepolymer as potting compound for hollow fibrehaemodialyzer, Indian Journal of Chemical Technology, 1997, 4, 89 – 93, IF: 0.513

47. JayabalanM. * and Lizymol P.P.,Studies on migration behavior of chemically treated plasticized poly(vinyl chloride) for blood contact applications , Journal of Material Science Letters, 1995,14, 589 – 5919
				
48. Lizymol P.P.andSabuThomas* Thermal  flame and mechanical behavior of  ternary   blends of poly(vinyl chloride), poly(ethylene - co - vinyl acetate) and poly(styrene - co - acrylonitrile) 	ThermochimicaActa, 1994, 233, 283 – 295, IF: 2.184

49. Lizymol   P. P.andSabuThomas* Miscibility studies of polymer blends by viscosity methods, Journal of Applied Polymer Science, 1994, 51, 635 – 641, IF: 1.6

50 Lizymol P. Pand  SabuThomas*  Binary polymer systems, interactions in solutions and their relationship to solid  state compatibility,  European Polymer Journal, 1994, 30, 1135 – 1142, IF: 3.005
	
51 Lizymol P.P.and Sabu Thomas *Thermal behaviour of polymer blends, a comparison of thermal properties of  miscible and immiscible blends,	Polymer Degradation and   Stability, 1993,41,   59 – 64, IF: 3.291

52. Lizymol P.P*. COVID-19 Challenges in Dentistry and Alternative Treatment Possibilities Trends in Biomaterials & Artificial Organs ,2020, 34 (S2), 31-33

References

External links

 List of publications

Living people
Indian materials scientists
Women materials scientists and engineers
21st-century Indian women scientists
21st-century Indian scientists
Mahatma Gandhi University, Kerala alumni
Year of birth missing (living people)